Kleppe is the administrative centre of Klepp municipality in Rogaland county, Norway. The village is located about halfway between the lakes Orrevatnet and Frøylandsvatnet. Klepp Church is located in Kleppe.

The population around Kleppe is growing rapidly, mostly in the form of suburban single-family homes, but also in the form of apartment blocks. The village of Kleppe and its suburb Verdalen have grown together to form one large urban area known as Kleppe or Kleppe/Verdalen.

Name
The name "Kleppe" comes from the Old Norse word "kleppr" which means "stone" or "hill".

References

Villages in Rogaland
Klepp